The Right That Failed is a 1922 American silent melodrama film directed by Bayard Veiller. Based on a short story by John Phillips Marquand, the film stars Bert Lytell, Virginia Valli, and De Witt Jennings. It was released by Metro Pictures on February 20, 1922. It is not known whether the film currently survives.

Plot
As described in a film magazine, prize fighter Johnny Duffey (Lytell) falls in love with a young society woman Constance Talbot (Valli). When he breaks his right hand in a bout and is forced to rest for three months, Johnny goes to the fashionable resort Craigmoor to be near Constance. One of his hero-worshipers, a chauffeur, becomes his valet and tutor in correct social etiquette. Constances father (Harlan) recognizes Johnny but keeps his secret until Johnny whips Roy Van Twiller (McCullough), a cad who was attempting to expose him. Constance learns Johnny's true profession, and they obtain her parents’ approval for their marriage.

Cast
 Bert Lytell as Johnny Duffey
 Virginia Valli as Constance Talbot
 De Witt Jennings as Mr. Talbot
 Philo McCullough as Roy Van Twiller
 Otis Harlan as Mr. Duffey
 Max Davidson as Michael Callahan

References

External links

American silent feature films
American black-and-white films
Melodrama films
1922 drama films
Silent American drama films
Metro Pictures films
1922 films
1920s American films